A Socolar tiling is an example of an aperiodic tiling, developed in 1989 by Joshua Socolar in the exploration of quasicrystals. There are 3 tiles a 30° rhombus, square, and regular hexagon. The 12-fold symmmetry set exist similar to the 10-fold Penrose rhombic tilings, and 8-fold Ammann–Beenker tilings.

The 12-fold tiles easily tile periodically, so special rules are defined to limit their connections and force nonperiodic tilings. Each tile disallowed from touching another of itself, while the hexagon can connect to both and itself, but only in alternate edges.

Dodecagonal rhomb tiling 
The dodecagonal rhomb tiling include three tiles, a 30° rhombus, a 60° rhombus, and a square. And expanded set can also include an equilateral triangle, half of the 60° rhombus.60° rhombus.

See Also 
 Pattern block - 6 tiles based on 12-fold symmetry, including the 3 Socolar tiles
 Socolar–Taylor tile - A different tiling named after Socolar

References

Aperiodic tilings